Botallackite, chemical formula Cu2(OH)3Cl is a secondary copper mineral, named for its type locality at the Botallack Mine, St Just in Penwith, Cornwall.

Botallackite crystallises in the monoclinic crystal system. It is mountain-green to green in colour, with one distinct to good cleavage.

Discovery and occurrence
It was first described in 1865 for an occurrence in the Botallack mine, Cornwall, England, and named for the type locality.

Botallackite forms in copper deposits exposed to weathering and salt water. It is reported from black smoker deposits due to reaction of primary sulfide minerals with seawater. It also occurs on copper bearing slag exposed to seawater. Minerals associated with botallackite include atacamite, paratacamite, brochantite, connellite and gypsum.

References

Copper(II) minerals
Halide minerals
Monoclinic minerals
Minerals in space group 11